The first of the International Mathematical Olympiads (IMOs) was held in Romania in 1959. The oldest of the International Science Olympiads, the IMO has since been held annually, except in 1980. That year, the competition initially planned to be held in Mongolia was cancelled due to the Soviet invasion of Afghanistan. Because the competition was initially founded for Eastern European countries participating in the Warsaw Pact, under the influence of the Eastern Bloc, the earlier IMOs were hosted only in Eastern European countries, gradually spreading to other nations. Sources differ about the cities hosting some of the early IMOs and the exact dates when they took place.

The first IMO was held in Romania in 1959. Seven countries entered – Bulgaria, Czechoslovakia, East Germany, Hungary, Poland, Romania and the Soviet Union – with the hosts finishing as the top-ranked nation. The number of participating countries has since risen: 14 countries took part in 1969, 50 in 1989, and 104 in 2009.

North Korea is the only country to have been caught cheating, resulting in its disqualification at the 32nd IMO in 1991 and the 51st IMO in 2010. In January 2011, Google gave €1 million to the IMO organization to help cover the costs of the events from 2011 to 2015.

List of Olympiads

See also
Asian Pacific Mathematics Olympiad
Provincial Mathematical Olympiad
List of mathematics competitions
List of International Mathematical Olympiad exceptional participants

Notes

References

Bibliography

External links
Official IMO site
International Mathematical Olympiad Info Page at Mathematical Association of America

International Mathematical Olympiad